Penprysg is a residential area of the town of Pencoed in Bridgend County Borough, Wales.

Governance
Penprysg is a community ward to Pencoed Town Council. 

Penprysg was also the name of an electoral ward, which extended to the north of Pencoed.The Penprysg county electoral ward, since 1999, was represented by one county councillor on Bridgend County Borough Council. The ward covered the Penprysg community ward and the entire community of Coychurch Higher.

Effective from the 2022 local elections, Coychurch Higher was combined with the entire Pencoed community to create a new ward, named "Pencoed and Penprysg", electing three county borough councillors.

References

Wards of Bridgend County Borough
Pencoed